Bhrashtachar is a 1989 Indian Hindi-language film directed by Ramesh Sippy, produced by G.P.Sippy, starring Mithun Chakraborty, Rekha, Anupam Kher, Raza Murad and Abhinav Chaturvedi, with Rajinikanth in a special appearance. and introduced Shilpa Shirodkar.

Summary
Cunning politician Purshottam (Anupam Kher) is about to contest an election, but Bhavani Dutt (Rekha) a journalist, Ashutosh Das (Mithun Chakraborty) an alcoholic police officer, and Abdul Sattar (Rajinikanth), a politician are against this move of Purshottam as they know about his criminal activities and the three join hands to bring Purshottam to justice to save the innocent people.

But Purshottam is good enough to plot the trio's fall as Bhavani is arrested for the murder of a prostitute and Abdul Sattar is accused of rape and murder of a blind girl Gopi (Shilpa Shirodkar), while Ashutosh gets fired from the police job itself. The climax shows how the trio gets the punishment for Purshottam.

Cast

 Rekha ... Bhavani Dutt
 Mithun Chakraborty ... Inspector Ashutosh Das
 Rajnikanth ... Abdul Sattar (special appearance)
 Shilpa Shirodkar ... Gopi
 Anupam Kher ... Purshottam
 Raza Murad ... Insp. Zorawar
 Padma Khanna....Janaki, mother of Gopi
 Anjana Mumtaz ... Jayanti Devi (Bhavani's mother)
 Abhinav Chaturvedi ... Gopal (Bhavani's brother)
 Beena ... Deepali Das
 Vikas Anand ... Purshottam's Lawyer
 Deep Dhillon ... Deepak Dhillon
 Sudhir Pandey ... Phatte Dada
 Mangal Dhillon ... Mangal
 Bharti Achrekar...Madhavi
 Ajay Wadhavkar..Police Constable Vinayak
 Lalit Mohan Tiwari...Keshav Kumar Income Tax Officer
Murad.....Judge (special appearance)
 Sunil Shende...Karamveer Ganesh Dutt, Bhavani's Father
 Gopi Desai ... Sunaina, Prostitute
 Amrit Patel ... Dhanmal
 Girija Shankar ... Charan Das
 Vinod Nagpal... Ronakalal

Soundtrack

The lyrics written by Anand Bakshi to the music composed by Laxmikant–Pyarelal.

References

External links
 

1989 films
1980s Hindi-language films
Films directed by Ramesh Sippy
Films scored by Laxmikant–Pyarelal
Films about corruption in India